Ute Kircheis-Wessel (born Ute Kircheis on 18 May 1953) is a retired German fencer. She won a gold medal in the women's team foil at the 1984 Summer Olympics. At the 1976 Summer Olympics she finished in 32nd and fourth place in the individual and team foil events, respectively. She won four medals at world championships in the team foil between 1977 and 1983. Her brother-in-law Friedrich Wessel is also an Olympic foil fencer.

References

External links
 

1953 births
Living people
German female fencers
Olympic fencers of West Germany
Fencers at the 1976 Summer Olympics
Fencers at the 1984 Summer Olympics
Olympic gold medalists for West Germany
Olympic medalists in fencing
Medalists at the 1984 Summer Olympics
Sportspeople from Cologne (region)
People from Bergheim, North Rhine-Westphalia